Coal Creek is a 2013 novel by the Australian author Alex Miller.

Reception
 Geordie Williamson, 'Alex Miller's 'Coal Creek', September 2003, "The Monthly", accessed November 2013.
 Brian Matthews, 'Hanging on the Cross, Alex Miller's Journey of the Imagination', October 2013, "Australian Book Review", accessed November 2013.

Coal Creek won the 2014 Victorian Premier's Prize for Fiction.

Interviews
Jane Sullivan, 'Interview: Alex Miller', 'The Sydney Morning Herald', October 5, 2013, accessed January 2014.

References

 

Novels by Alex Miller
2013 Australian novels
Allen & Unwin books